Paxistima canbyi is a species of small broadleaf evergreen shrub or groundcover that is usually about  high, but can grow up to almost  high. It is in the family Celastraceae, and is known by the common names of Canby's mountain-lover, rat-stripper, ratstripper, Canby paxistima, or cliff green. It is native to the Appalachian Region of the eastern United States. Canby's mountain-lover is rare throughout its natural range from south-central Pennsylvania down into eastern North Carolina to western Kentucky and southern Ohio. It grows in USDA hardiness zones 3 to 7.

The foliage is of fine texture and is lustrous dark green above in summer and often develops a bronze tint in cold weather. The tiny, inconspicuous flowers are perfect and greenish or reddish-green blooming in late April or early May with four petals and sepals.

In the wild it grows over a large range of conditions from a shady site with moist, organic soil to full sun with calcareous, rocky soil on uplands and cliffs. When trying to grow it in a garden or landscape, it is best to grow it in a moist but well-drained organic acidic soil in a shady, sheltered site, as it is finicky and often does not adapt to cultivation and dies out even with good conditions. It is a rare plant in landscapes, but is sold by some large or specialty or native plant nurseries, usually in small pots, as a groundcover. Canby's mountain-lover is listed as a candidate species for federal listing by the United States Fish and Wildlife Service.

References

Celastraceae